Zois is a martyr in wendish mythology, probably a reference to the obotrite king Stois or Stoigar, who was beheaded by emperor Otto the Great.

References
Ingeman, B. S. Grundtræk til En Nord-Slavisk og Vendisk Gudelære. Copenhagen 1824.

Slavic mythology